Desnudo (Naked) is eight studio album recorded by Mexican performer Emmanuel. It was released by RCA Ariola in 1986 (see 1986 in music). The album was also released in the United States under the title Solo with different cover art, and this version was nominated for a Grammy Award for Best Latin Pop Performance.

The album included his cover of the Italian pop song, "Tutta la vita," retitled "Toda la vida." The song was Emmanuel's biggest hit of the 1980s, and still remains one of his most popular songs, as well as one of his personal favorites. When it went to #1, it had the distinction of nudging another Spanish version of the song by Cuban singer Franco out of the top spot. He also had a lesser hit with the song "No Te Quites la Ropa."

Track listing
 "Con Que Derecho"
 "No Te Quites La Ropa"
 "Mujer De Tantos Hombres"
 "Luces De Bohemia Para Elisa"
 "Toda La Vida"
 "Es Mi Mujer"
 "Enfrentarnos De Nuevo A La Vida"
 "Rayo De Luna"
 "Solo"
 "Que Largo Fin De Semana"

See also
 List of number-one Billboard Latin Pop Albums from the 1980s

References

1986 albums
Emmanuel (singer) albums
Spanish-language albums
RCA Records albums
Albums produced by Juan Carlos Calderón